Isle of the Senecas, also called Little Island, is an island in the Mohawk River south of Scotia in Schenectady County, New York.

References

Islands of New York (state)
Mohawk River
River islands of New York (state)